"So This Is Love" is a 1948 song composed by Al Hoffman, Mack David, and Jerry Livingston. It was written for Walt Disney's Cinderella, in which it was performed by Ilene Woods and Mike Douglas. It is sung by the characters of Cinderella and Prince Charming as they dance with each other at the ball. Composed in  time (also known as waltz time), a secondary title, "The Cinderella Waltz", appears in parenthesis next to or beneath the song's main name on many editions of sheet music. Prior to the Hoffman, David, and Livingston trio joining the film, songs for Cinderella were written by Larry Morey and Charles Walcott, with a song entitled "Dancing on a Cloud" intended for the ball scene. However, their songs would be scrapped. The song does not appear in Disney's 2015 live-action adaptation of the film, replaced instead with 19th-century inspired waltzes and polkas written by cinematic composer Patrick Doyle.

Ilene Woods also commercially recorded the song with RCA Victor in 1949 to help promote the film's release the next year. It has since been performed by artists such as Vaughn Monroe, Vera Lynn, James Ingram, and Dave Brubeck, amongst others.

References 

1948 songs
Cinderella (franchise)
Disney songs
Love themes
Songs based on fairy tales
Songs written by Al Hoffman
Songs written by Jerry Livingston
Songs with lyrics by Mack David
Walt Disney Records singles